Svetićevo is a village in Serbia. It is situated in the Bačka Topola municipality, in the North Bačka District, Vojvodina province. The village has a Serb ethnic majority and its population numbering 205 people (2002 census).

Name
In Serbian the village is known as Svetićevo (Светићево); in Hungarian as Buránysor, Szvetityevo, Székelytornyos or Istenkeze; and in Croatian as Svetićevo.

Historical population

1961: 1,292
1971: 1,148
1981: 257
1991: 229
2002: 205

References
Slobodan Ćurčić, Broj stanovnika Vojvodine, Novi Sad, 1996.

See also
List of places in Serbia
List of cities, towns and villages in Vojvodina

Places in Bačka